Harpalus pulvinatus is a species of ground beetle in the subfamily Harpalinae. It was described by Mentries in 1848.

References

pulvinatus
Beetles described in 1848